In Greek mythology, Phytalus (Ancient Greek: Φύταλος, Phútalos) was a hero and king of Attica who gave Demeter hospitality when she was searching for her daughter, Persephone. Demeter thanked Phytalus for his kindness by giving him a fig-tree. He was revered in Eleusis. His tomb was shown in the deme Lakidai near Cephisus.

Members of the clan Phytalidae, who claimed descent from Phytalus, were said to have cleansed Theseus of the murders he had committed on his way from Troezen to Athens and to have later been put in charge of the hero cult of Theseus in reward for their hospitality.

Notes

References 

 Lucius Mestrius Plutarchus, Lives with an English Translation by Bernadotte Perrin. Cambridge, MA. Harvard University Press. London. William Heinemann Ltd. 1914. 1. Online version at the Perseus Digital Library. Greek text available from the same website.
 Pausanias, Description of Greece with an English Translation by W.H.S. Jones, Litt.D., and H.A. Ormerod, M.A., in 4 Volumes. Cambridge, MA, Harvard University Press; London, William Heinemann Ltd. 1918. . Online version at the Perseus Digital Library
 Pausanias, Graeciae Descriptio. 3 vols. Leipzig, Teubner. 1903.  Greek text available at the Perseus Digital Library.

Kings of Athens
Kings in Greek mythology
Attican characters in Greek mythology
Eleusinian mythology
Deeds of Demeter